Events from the year 1970 in the United Kingdom.

Incumbents
 Monarch – Elizabeth II
 Prime Minister
 Harold Wilson (Labour) (until 19 June)
 Edward Heath (Conservative) (starting 19 June)
 Parliament
 44th (until 29 May)
 45th (starting 29 June)

Events

January
 1 January
 The age of majority for most legal purposes is reduced from 21 to 18 under terms of the Family Law Reform Act 1969.
 The half crown coin ceases to be legal tender.
 The National Westminster Bank begins trading following merger of National Provincial Bank and Westminster Bank.
 Control of London Transport passes from the London Transport Board (reporting to the Minister of Transport) to the London Transport Executive of the Greater London Council, except for country area (green) buses which pass to London Country Bus Services, a subsidiary of the National Bus Company.
 18 January – The grave of Karl Marx at Highgate Cemetery in London is vandalised.
 21 January – Fraserburgh life-boat Duchess of Kent, on service to the Danish fishing vessel Opal, capsizes with the loss of five of the six crew.
 22 January – A Boeing 747 lands at Heathrow Airport, the first jumbo jet to land in Britain.
 26 January – Rolling Stone frontman Mick Jagger is fined £200 for possession of cannabis.

February
 February
 Chrysler UK launches its new Hillman Avenger small family car, which will be built at the Ryton plant near Coventry and compete with the likes of the Ford Escort and Vauxhall Viva.
 Richard Branson starts the Virgin Group with discounted mail-order sales of popular records.
 13 February
 Garden House riot, Cambridge: a demonstration at the Garden House Hotel by Cambridge University students against the Greek military junta leads to police intervention; eight students subsequently receive custodial sentences for their part in the affair.
 English band Black Sabbath release their self titled debut album in the UK, credited as the first major album in the heavy metal genre.
 19 February – The Prince of Wales (now Charles III) joins the Royal Navy.
 23 February – Rolls-Royce ask the government for £50,000,000 towards the development of the RB 211-50 Airbus jet engine.
 27 February–1 March – First National Women's Liberation Conference held, at Ruskin College, Oxford.

March
 2 March – Rhodesian Prime Minister Ian Smith declares Rhodesia a republic, breaking all ties with the British Crown; four years after the declaration of independence. The Government refuses to recognise the new state as long as the Rhodesian Government opposes majority rule.
 6 March – The importation of pets is banned after an outbreak of rabies in Newmarket, Suffolk.
 12 March 
 The Bridgwater by-election becomes the first election in which eighteen-year-olds are entitled to vote. Tom King of the Conservative Party is elected.
 The quarantine period for cats and dogs is increased to one year as part of the government's anti-rabies measures.
 17 March – Martin Peters, who scored for England in their 1966 World Cup final win, becomes the nation's first £200,000 footballer in his transfer from West Ham United to Tottenham Hotspur.
 23 March – Eighteen victims of thalidomide are awarded a total of nearly £370,000 in compensation.

April
 1 April – Everton win the Football League First Division title.
 10 April
 Paul McCartney publicly announces that he has left The Beatles in a press release, written in mock-interview style, included in promotional copies of his first solo album and headlined in the Daily Mirror newspaper.
 The Elton John album is released, the second album by Elton John, but the first to be released in the United States.
 11 April – Chelsea and Leeds United draw 2–2 in the FA Cup final at Wembley Stadium, forcing a replay.
 16 April – Dr. Ian Paisley enters the Parliament of Northern Ireland after winning the Bannside By-election.
 18 April – British Leyland announces that the Morris Minor, its longest-running model which has been in production since 1948, will be discontinued at the start of next year and be replaced with a new larger car available as a four-door saloon and three-door fastback coupe, and possibly a five-door estate by 1975.
 21 April – The moderate Alliance Party is formed in Northern Ireland, initially as a platform for liberal Unionists and pro-O'Neill voters. From the outset though, it declares as neither Unionist nor Nationalist, instead declaring as 'Other'.
 29 April – David Webb scores the winning goal as Chelsea defeat Leeds United 2–1 in the FA Cup final replay at Old Trafford, gaining them the trophy for the very first time. Last year's winners Manchester City clinch the European Cup Winners' Cup with a 2–1 win over Górnik Zabrze of Poland in Vienna, Austria.

May
 19 May – The government makes a £20,000,000 loan available to help save the financially troubled luxury car and aircraft engine manufacturer Rolls-Royce.
 22 May – A tour of England by the South African cricket team is called off after several African and Asian countries threaten to boycott the Commonwealth Games.
 23 May – A fire occurs in the Britannia Bridge over the Menai Strait near Bangor, Caernarfonshire, Wales, contributing to its partial destruction and amounting to approximately £1,000,000 worth of fire damage.
 27 May – A British expedition climbs the south face of Annapurna I.
 28 May – Bobby Moore, captain of the England national football team, is arrested and released on bail in Bogotá, Colombia, on suspicion of stealing a bracelet in the Bogotá Bracelet incident.
 29 May – Law Reform (Miscellaneous Provisions) Act abolishes actions for breach of promise and the right of a husband to claim damages for adultery with his wife.

June
 1 June – Prime Minister Harold Wilson is hit in the face with an egg thrown by Richard Ware, a Young Conservative demonstrator.
 2 June – Cleddau Bridge, in Pembrokeshire, collapses during erection, killing four, leading to introduction of new standards for box girder bridges.
 4 June – Tonga becomes independent from the UK.
 10 June – Just a few months after the Conservatives had enjoyed opinion poll leads of more than 20 points, the polls are showing Labour several points ahead of the Conservatives with eight days to go before the general election. If Labour were to win the election, it would be a record third consecutive win for them and would probably result in the end of Edward Heath's five-year reign as Conservative leader.
 13 June
 Actor Laurence Olivier is made a life peer in the Queen's Birthday Honours list. He is the first actor to be made a lord.
 "The Long and Winding Road" becomes the Beatles' 20th and final single to reach number one on the US Billboard Hot 100 chart in the US. 
 14 June – England's defence of the FIFA World Cup ends when they lose 3–2 to West Germany at the quarter final in Mexico.
 17 June
 The bodies of two children are found buried in shallow graves in woodland at Waltham Abbey, Essex. They are believed to be those of Susan Blatchford (11) and Gary Hanlon (12), who were last seen alive near their homes in North London on 31 March this year. These become known as the "Babes in the Wood murders" and remain unsolved until a confession in 1998.
 British Leyland creates a niche in the four-wheel drive market by launching its luxury Range Rover, which is to be marketed as a more upmarket and urban alternative to the utilitarian Land Rover that has been in production since 1948.
 David Storey's Home is premiered at the Royal Court Theatre.
 18 June – 1970 general election: the Conservative Party wins and Edward Heath becomes Prime Minister, ousting the Labour government of Harold Wilson after nearly six years in power. The election result is something of a surprise, as most of the opinion polls had predicted a third successive Labour win.
 19 June – Among the new Members of Parliament are future party leaders Neil Kinnock and John Smith for Labour; and Kenneth Clarke, Kenneth Baker, Norman Fowler and Geoffrey Howe for the Conservatives.
 21 June – British golfer Tony Jacklin wins the U.S. Open.
 22 June – The Methodist Church allows women to become full ministers for the first time.
 26 June – Riots break out in Derry over the arrest of Mid-Ulster MP Bernadette Devlin.
 29 June – Caroline Thorpe, 32-year-old wife of Liberal Party leader Jeremy Thorpe and mother of their two-year-old son Rupert, dies in a car crash.

July
 3 July
 Three civilians are killed and 10 troops injured when British Army soldiers battle with IRA troops in Belfast.
 Dan-Air Flight 1903: 112 people are killed when a Manchester to Barcelona flight crashes in the mountains of Northern Spain, with no survivors.
 8 July – Roy Jenkins becomes Deputy Leader of the Labour Party.
 12 July – Jack Nicklaus wins the Open Golf Championship at St Andrews, defeating fellow American Doug Sanders in an eighteen-hole play-off.
 14 July – 5 speedway riders die in Lokeren, Belgium when a minibus carrying members of the West Ham speedway team crashes into a petrol tanker after a brief tour. One of those killed is Phil Bishop, a founding member of the team from before WW2.
 15 July – Dockers vote to strike, leading to the docks strike of 1970.
 16 July – A state of emergency is declared to deal with the dockers' strike.
 16–25 July – The British Commonwealth Games are held in Edinburgh.
 17 July – Lord Pearson proposes settlement of the docks strike.
 23 July
 Two "tear gas" (CS gas) canisters are thrown into the House of Commons chamber.
 The 1970 Omani coup d'état takes place, with covert British support.
 30 July – The docks strike is settled.
 31 July – The last issue of grog in the Royal Navy is distributed.

August
 9 August – Police battle with black rioters in Notting Hill, London.
 20 August – England national football team captain Bobby Moore is cleared of stealing a bracelet while on World Cup duty in Colombia.
 21 August – The moderate Social Democratic and Labour Party is established in Northern Ireland.
 26–31 August – The Isle of Wight Festival 1970 begins on East Afton Farm. Some 600,000 people attend the largest rock festival of all time. Artists include Jimi Hendrix, The Who, The Doors, Chicago, Richie Havens, John Sebastian, Joan Baez, Ten Years After, Emerson, Lake & Palmer, The Moody Blues and Jethro Tull.
 27 August – The Royal Shakespeare Company's revolutionary production of Shakespeare's A Midsummer Night's Dream, directed by Peter Brook, opens at Stratford.

September
 9 September – BOAC Flight 775 is hijacked by the Popular Front for the Liberation of Palestine after taking off from Bahrain – the first time a British plane has been hijacked.
 12 September – Nijinsky becomes the first horse for 35 years to win the English Triple Crown by finishing first in the Epsom Derby, 2000 Guineas and St Leger.
 18 September – American rock star Jimi Hendrix, 27, is found dead in London from a suspected drug-induced heart attack.
 19 September – The first Glastonbury Festival is held, as the Worthy Farm Pop, Blues and Folk Festival. Tyrannosaurus Rex (replacing The Kinks) headline and about 1500 attend.
 September – The album musical Jesus Christ Superstar, by Andrew Lloyd Webber and Tim Rice, is released.

October
 3 October – Tony Densham, driving the "Commuter" dragster, sets a British land speed record at Elvington, Yorkshire, averaging 207.6 mph over the flying kilometre course.
 5 October – BBC Radio 4 first broadcasts consumer affairs magazine programme You and Yours; it would still be running forty years later.
 10 October – Fiji becomes independent from the United Kingdom.
 12 October – After a failed launch only eighteen months previously, British Leyland announce a much improved Austin Maxi featuring a new gearchange, increased engine size and much improved trim, answering many of the critical points raised by the motoring press at the car's original launch.
 15 October
 The government creates the Department of Trade and Industry and the Department of the Environment.
 Thames sailing barge Cambria, the last vessel trading under sail alone in British waters, loads her last freight, at Tilbury.
 The last narrowboats to carry long-distance freight commercially on the canals of the United Kingdom arrive with their last load, coal from Atherstone for a West London jam factory. 
 19 October – British Petroleum discover a large oil field in the North Sea.
 23 October – The Mark III Ford Cortina goes on sale. At launch a full range of models are offered including two-door and estate variants. Unlike previous models, this Cortina has been developed as a Ford Europe model sharing the floor-pan with the similar German Ford Taurus
 25 October – The Canonization of the Forty Martyrs of England and Wales by Pope Paul VI takes place.

November
 8 November – Comedy series The Goodies is first broadcast, on BBC Two.
 17 November – The first Page Three girl appears in The Sun newspaper.
 18 November – The first Iceland frozen food supermarket is opened, in Oswestry, by Malcolm Walker.
 20 November – The ten shilling note ceases to be legal tender.
 27 November – The Gay Liberation Front organises its first march in London.
 30 November – British Caledonian Airways Ltd (BCal) is formed by the merger of Caledonian Airways and British United Airways.

December
 10 December – Bernard Katz wins the Nobel Prize in Physiology or Medicine jointly with Ulf von Euler and Julius Axelrod "for their discoveries concerning the humoral transmittors in the nerve terminals and the mechanism for their storage, release and inactivation".
 31 December – Paul McCartney files a lawsuit against the other members of The Beatles to dissolve their partnership, effectively ending the band.

Undated
 The last forced child migration to Australia takes place.
 Mathematician Alan Baker wins a Fields Medal.
 Trade union membership now accounts for nearly 50% of the workforce.

Publications
 Agatha Christie's novel Passenger to Frankfurt.
 Len Deighton's 1943-set novel Bomber (the first written on a word processor).
 Lawrence Durrell's novel Nunquam, second in The Revolt of Aphrodite pair.
 J. G. Farrell's novel Troubles.
 Germaine Greer's book The Female Eunuch.
 Ted Hughes' poetry collection Crow.
 Bernice Rubens' novel The Elected Member.
 Mary Wilson's Selected Poems.
 The complete New English Bible (the New Testament having been published in 1961).
 The Ecologist magazine founded by Edward Goldsmith (July).

Births

January – March
 1 January – Stephen Kinnock, politician
 7 January – Andy Burnham, politician
 8 January – Nick Miller, weather forecaster
 19 January – Tim Foster, rower
 20 January – Mitch Benn, comedian and songwriter
 24 January – Maria Balshaw, art curator
 31 January – Minnie Driver, actress
 4 February – Gabrielle Anwar, actress 
 10 February – Rob Shearman, television and radio scriptwriter
 14 February – Simon Pegg, comedian, writer and actor
 21 February – Jay Blades, furniture restorer and television presenter
 25 February – Ian Walker, sailboat racer
 26 February – Mark Harper, politician
 1 March – Tina Cullen, field hockey player
 2 March – James Purnell, politician
 7 March – Jeff Hordley, actor
 9 March – Simon Monjack, screenwriter, film director (died 2010)
 11 March – Jane Slavin, actress and author

April – June
 14 April – Matt Allwright, television presenter and journalist 
 27 April – Kylie Travis, actress and model
 6 May – Chris Adams, cricketer
 15 May 
 Nicola Walker, actress
 Ben Wallace, Secretary of State for Defence
 17 May – Jeremy Browne, politician, Minister of State for Foreign Affairs
 20 May – Louis Theroux, television personality and author
 21 May – Jason Lee, field hockey player and coach
 22 May – Naomi Campbell, model and actress
 27 May – Joseph Fiennes, actor
 5 June – John Marquez, actor and cinematographer
 6 June – Angad Paul, businessman and film producer (died 2015)
 18 June – Katie Derham, TV and radio presenter
 19 June – MJ Hibbett, singer-songwriter
 20 June – Russell Garcia, field hockey player
 22 June – Christine Cook, field hockey player
 24 June – David May, footballer
 25 June – Lucy Benjamin, actress
 27 June – Jo Frost, nanny and television host

July – September
 2 July – Steve Morrow, footballer 
 4 July –  Doddie Weir, rugby union player (died 2022)
 5 July – Toby Whithouse, actor, screenwriter and playwright
 6 July
 David Readman, singer 
 Martin Smith, singer-songwriter
 7 July – Wayne McCullough, boxer
 10 July
 Jason Orange, singer
 John Simm, actor
 11 July – Sajjad Karim, politician
 12 July – Conrad Coates, English-Canadian actor and teacher
 13 July – Sharon Horgan, actress and screenwriter
 14 July – Seb Fontaine, electronic music producer & DJ
 16 July – Matt Healy, actor
 19 July – Nicola Sturgeon, Scottish politician
 25 July – Julien Fountain, English cricket coach 
 29 July – Andi Peters, television presenter and producer
 30 July – Christopher Nolan, writer and director
 31 July – Ben Chaplin, actor
 13 August – Alan Shearer, footballer
 27 August – Peter Ebdon, snooker player
 18 September – Darren Gough, cricketer
 21 September – Samantha Power, United States Ambassador to the United Nations
 29 September – Emily Lloyd, actress
 30 September – Mark Smith, actor and bodybuilder

October – December
 4 October
 Jason Cousins, footballer
 Richard Hancox, footballer
 5 October – Tasmina Ahmed-Sheikh, SNP politician and Member of Parliament
 8 October – Sadiq Khan, Mayor of London
 10 October – Sir Matthew Pinsent, Olympic winning rower
 11 October – Andy Marriott, footballer
 29 October – Toby Smith, musician (died 2017)
 2 November – Matthew Syed, journalist
 7 November – Neil Hannon, chamber pop musician (The Divine Comedy)
 12 November – Harvey Spencer Stephens, child actor
 13 November – Verity Snook-Larby, race walker
 22 November – Stel Pavlou, novelist and screenwriter
 23 November – Zoe Ball, television and radio presenter
 28 November – Richard Osman, television presenter and writer
 6 December – Lewis MacLeod, Scottish actor and voice actor 
 7 December – Andrew Gilding, darts player
 10 December – Susanna Reid, television presenter and journalist
 11 December – Matthew Strachan, composer and singer-songwriter (died 2021)
 17 December – Stella Tennant, model (died 2020)
 20 December – Alister McRae, Scottish rally driver
 29 December – Aled Jones, singer and television presenter
 31 December – Louise Rickard, Welsh rugby union player

Undated
 Helen Cammock, artist
 Pat McGrath, make-up artist
 Alison Phillips, newspaper editor

Deaths

January – March
 7 January – Allan Wilkie, Shakespearean actor noted for his career in Australia (born 1878)
 13 January – Jimmy Hanley, actor (born 1918)
 23 January – Ifan ab Owen Edwards, Welsh youth worker, founder of the Urdd (born 1895)
 26 January 
 Albert Evans-Jones (Cynan), Welsh poet and dramatist (born 1895)
 Sir Noel Laurence, admiral (born 1882)
 29 January – Basil Liddell Hart, military historian (born 1895)
 30 January – Malcolm Keen, actor (born 1887)
 2 February – Bertrand Russell, logician and philosopher, recipient of the Nobel Prize in Literature (born 1872)
 14 February – Herbert Strudwick, cricketer (born 1880)
 15 February – Hugh Dowding, commander of RAF Fighter Command during the Battle of Britain (born 1882)
 28 February – Arthur Henry Knighton-Hammond, painter (born 1875)

 29 March – Vera Brittain, writer (born 1893)

April – June
 20 April – Thomas Iorwerth Ellis, academic (born 1899)
 7 May – Jack Jones, novelist (born 1884)
 20 May – Sir John Whiteley, general (born 1896)
 26 May – R. V. C. Bodley, army officer, traveller and writer (born 1892)
 7 June – E. M. Forster, novelist (born 1879)
 15 June – Robert Morrison MacIver, Scottish-born sociologist (born 1882)
 27 June – Edwin La Dell, artist (born 1914)
 30 June – Githa Sowerby, dramatist (born 1876)

July – September
 7 July – Allen Lane, publisher (born 1902)
 20 July – Iain Macleod, politician (born 1913)
 29 July – John Barbirolli, conductor (born 1899)
 5 September – Jesse Pennington, footballer (born 1883)

October – December
 8 November – Alasdair Mackenzie, Liberal MP (born 1903)
 13 November – Bessie Braddock, Labour MP (born 1899)
 29 November – Irfan Orga, Ottoman-born airman and author (born 1908)
 14 December – William Slim, Field Marshal (born 1891)
 26 December
 Lillian Board, Olympic athlete (born 1948)
Henry Montgomery Campbell, former Bishop of London (born 1887)
 31 December – Cyril Scott, composer and writer (born 1879)

See also
 1970 in British music
 1970 in British television
 List of British films of 1970

References

 
Years of the 20th century in the United Kingdom